The Ramadan Revolution, also referred to as the 8 February Revolution and the February 1963 coup d'état in Iraq, was a military coup by the Ba'ath Party's Iraqi-wing which overthrew the Prime Minister of Iraq, Abd al-Karim Qasim in 1963. It took place between 8 and 10 February 1963. Qasim's former deputy, Abdul Salam Arif, who was not a Ba'athist, was given the largely ceremonial title of President, while prominent Ba'athist general Ahmed Hassan al-Bakr was named Prime Minister. The most powerful leader of the new government was the secretary general of the Iraqi Ba'ath Party, Ali Salih al-Sa'di, who controlled the National Guard militia and organized a massacre of hundreds—if not thousands—of suspected communists and other dissidents following the coup.

The government lasted approximately nine months, until Arif disarmed the National Guard in the November 1963 Iraqi coup d'état, which was followed by a purge of Ba'ath Party members.

Background
Some time after the Homeland Officers' Organization, or "Al-Ahrar" ("The Free") succeeded in toppling the monarchy and transforming the Iraqi government into a republic in 1958, signs of differences between political parties and forces and the Homeland Officers' Organization began when Pan-Arab nationalist forces led by Abdul Salam Arif and the Ba'ath Party called for immediate unification with the United Arab Republic (UAR). In an attempt to create a state of political equilibrium, the Iraqi Communist Party (ICP), which opposed unity, tried to discount cooperation with the UAR in economics, culture, and science rather than political and military agreements.

Gradually, Abd al-Karim Qasim's relations with some of his fellow members of Al-Ahrar worsened, and his relationship with the unionist and nationalist currents, which had played an active role in supporting the 1958 movement, became strained. As for conflicting currents in the ICP, they were aspiring for a coalition with General Qasim and had long been extending their relationship with him. Qasim thought that some of his allies in the Communist party were coming close to leapfrogging the proposition, especially after the increasing influence of the Communist party in the use of the slogan, proclaimed by many Communists and government supporters during marches: "Long live leader Abd al-Karim and the Communist Party in governing great demand!" Qasim began to minimize the Communist movement, which was poised to overthrow the government. He ordered the party to be disarmed and most of the party leaders to be arrested. However, the party retained Air Commander Jalal al-Awqati and Lt. Col. Fadhil Abbas Mahdawi, Qasim's cousin.

An overlapping set of both internal and regional factors created conditions conducive to the overthrow of Prime Minister Abd al-Karim Qasim and his staff. Some historians have argued that the overthrow can be attributed to the blundering individualism of Qasim and the errors committed in the execution of leaders and locals as well as acts of violence which arose from the Communist militias allied with Qasim. Also to blame may be an increasingly forceful disagreement with Field Marshal Abdul Salam Arif, who was under house arrest. Qasim also made statements reiterating his support for Syrian General Abdel-Karim and Colonel Alnhlaoi Mowaffaq Asasa, with the intent of encouraging a coup to divide Syria, which was then joined with Egypt as part of the UAR.

Coup

Qasim's removal took place on 8 February 1963, the fourteenth day of Ramadan, and so the coup was called the 14 Ramadan Coup. It had been in its planning stages since 1962, and several attempts had been planned, only to be abandoned for fear of discovery. The coup had been initially planned for January 18, but was moved to 25 January and then 8 February after Qasim gained knowledge of the proposed attempt and arrested some of the plotters.

The coup began in the early morning of 8 February 1963, when the communist air force chief, Jalal al-Awqati, was assassinated, and tank units occupied the Abu Ghraib radio station. A bitter two-day struggle unfolded with heavy fighting between the Ba'athist conspirators and pro-Qasim forces. Qasim took refuge in the Ministry of Defence, where fighting became particularly heavy. Communist sympathisers took to the streets to resist the coup, which added to the high casualties: "An estimated eighty Ba'thists and between 300 and 5,000 communist sympathizers were killed in the two days of fighting to control Baghdad's streets," as recounted by Ariel Ira Ahram.

On 9 February, Qasim eventually offered his surrender in return for safe passage out of the country. His request was refused, and in the afternoon, he was executed on the orders of the newly formed National Council of the Revolutionary Command (NCRC). Qasim was given a mock trial over Baghdad radio and then killed. Many of his Shi'ite supporters believed that he had merely gone into hiding and would appear like the Mahdi to lead a rebellion against the new government. To counter that sentiment and to terrorize his supporters, Qasim's dead body was displayed on television in a five-minute propaganda video, The End of the Criminals, which included close-up views of his bullet wounds amid disrespectful treatment of his corpse, which is spat on in the final scene.

Qasim's former deputy, Abdul Salam Arif, who was not a Ba'athist, was given the largely-ceremonial title of President, and the prominent Ba'athist General Ahmed Hassan al-Bakr was named Prime Minister. However, the secretary general of the Ba'ath Party, Ali Salih al-Sa'di, used his control of the National Guard militia, commanded by Mundhir al-Wanadawi, to establish himself as the de facto new leader of Iraq and had more authority in reality than al-Bakr or Arif. The nine-month rule of al-Sa'di and his civilian branch of the Ba'ath Party has been described as "a reign of terror" as the National Guard, under orders from the Revolutionary Command Council (RCC) "to annihilate anyone who disturbs the peace," detained, tortured, or executed thousands of suspected Qasim loyalists. Furthermore, the National Guard, which developed from a core group of perhaps 5,000 civilian Ba'athist partisans but increased to 34,000 members by August 1963, who were identified by their green armbands, was poorly-disciplined, as militiamen engaged in extensive infighting and created a widespread perception of chaos and disorder.

U.S. involvement

While there have been persistent rumors that the Central Intelligence Agency (CIA) orchestrated the coup, publicly declassified documents and the testimony of former CIA officers do not support claims of direct American involvement, although the U.S. had been notified of two aborted Ba'athist coup plots in July and December 1962 and its post-coup actions suggested that "at best it condoned and at worst it contributed to the violence that followed," in the words of Nathan J. Citino. Despite evidence that the CIA had been closely tracking the Ba'ath Party's coup planning since "at least 1961," a CIA official working with Archie Roosevelt Jr. to instigate a military coup against Qasim, and who later became the head of the CIA's operations in Iraq and Syria, has "denied any involvement in the Ba'ath Party's actions," stating instead that the CIA's efforts against Qasim were still in the planning stages at the time. Bryan R. Gibson believes that "barring the release of new information, the preponderance of evidence substantiates the conclusion that the CIA was not behind the February 1963 Ba'thist coup." By contrast, Brandon Wolfe-Hunnicutt states that "Scholars remain divided in their interpretations of American foreign policy toward the February 1963 coup in Iraq," but along with several other authors cites "compelling evidence of an American role in the coup."

Although it may not have organized the coup, U.S. officials were undoubtedly pleased with the outcome, ultimately approving a $55 million arms deal with Iraq and urging America's Arab allies to oppose a Soviet-sponsored diplomatic offensive accusing Iraq of genocide against its Kurdish minority at the United Nations (UN) General Assembly. It is also widely believed that the CIA provided the new government with lists of communists and other leftists, who were then arrested or killed by the National Guard. This allegation originated in a 27 September 1963 Al-Ahram interview with King Hussein of Jordan, who—seeking to dispel reports that he was on the CIA's payroll—declared:
You tell me that American Intelligence was behind the 1957 events in Jordan. Permit me to tell you that I know for a certainty that what happened in Iraq on 8 February had the support of American Intelligence. Some of those who now rule in Baghdad do not know of this thing but I am aware of the truth. Numerous meetings were held between the Ba'ath party and American Intelligence, the more important in Kuwait. Do you know that ... on 8 February a secret radio beamed to Iraq was supplying the men who pulled the coup with the names and addresses of the Communists there so that they could be arrested and executed? ... Yet I am the one accused of being an agent of America and imperialism!

According to Hanna Batatu, however, "The Ba'athists had ample opportunity to gather such particulars in 1958-1959, when the Communists came wholly into the open, and earlier, during the Front of National Unity Years—1957-1958—when they had frequent dealings with them on all levels." In addition, "The lists in question proved to be in part out of date", which could be taken as evidence they were compiled well before 1963. Batatu's explanation is supported by Bureau of Intelligence and Research reports stating that "[Communist] party members [are being] rounded up on the basis of lists prepared by the now-dominant Ba'th Party" and that the ICP had "exposed virtually all its assets" whom the Ba'athists had "carefully spotted and listed." On the other hand, Citino notes that two officials in the U.S. embassy in Baghdad—William Lakeland and James E. Akins—"used coverage of the July 1962 Moscow Conference for Disarmament and Peace in Iraq's leftist press to compile lists of Iraqi communists and their supporters ... Those listed included merchants, students, members of professional societies, and journalists, although university professors constituted the largest single group." Furthermore, "Weldon C. Mathews has meticulously established that National Guard leaders who participated in human rights abuses had been trained in the United States as part of a police program run by the International Cooperation Administration and Agency for International Development." The U.S. provided $120,000 in "police assistance" to Iraq during 1963–1965, considerably less than the $832,000 in assistance that it provided to Iran during those years.

Soviet tank "scandal"
The Kennedy administration officially advocated a diplomatic settlement to the First Iraqi–Kurdish War, but its provision of military aid to the Ba'athist government emboldened Iraqi hardliners to resume hostilities against Kurdish rebels on June 10, after which Iraq requested additional emergency U.S. assistance including napalm weapons. President Kennedy approved the arms sale in part on the recommendation of senior adviser Robert Komer and the weapons were provided, but an offer by Iraqi general Hasan Sabri al-Bayati to reciprocate this gesture by sending a Soviet T-54 tank in Iraq's possession to the U.S. embassy in Baghdad for inspection became something of a "scandal" as Bayati's offer had not been approved by al-Bakr, Foreign Minister Talib El-Shibib, or other senior Iraqi officials. Ultimately, the Ba'ath Party leadership reneged on that part of the agreement, fearing that handing over the tank to the U.S. would irrevocably harm Iraq's reputation. Shibib subsequently recounted that the incident damaged Iraq's relations with both the U.S. and the Soviet Union: "On the one side Iraq would lose the Soviets as a source of intelligence. On the other the United States would see us as a bunch of kid swindlers."

Soviet reaction

Throughout 1963, the Soviet Union actively worked to undermine the Ba'athist government, supporting Kurdish rebels under the leadership of Mustafa Barzani with propaganda and a "small monthly stipend for Barzani," suspending military shipments to Iraq in May, convincing its ally Mongolia to make charges of genocide against Iraq at the UN General Assembly from July to September, and sponsoring a failed communist coup attempt on July 3.

Influence on Syria 

The same year, the party's military committee in Syria succeeded in persuading Nasserist and independent officers to make common cause with it and successfully carried out a military coup on 8 March. A National Revolutionary Command Council took control, assigned itself legislative power, and appointed Salah al-Din al-Bitar as head of a "national front" government. The Ba'ath participated in the government, along with the Arab Nationalist Movement, the United Arab Front, and the Socialist Unity Movement.

As Batatu notes, that took place without the fundamental disagreement over immediate or "considered" reunification having been resolved. The Ba'ath moved to consolidate its power within the new government by purging Nasserist officers in April. Subsequent disturbances led to the fall of the al-Bitar government, and in the aftermath of Jasim Alwan’s failed Nasserist coup in July, the Ba'ath monopolized power.

Aftermath

The Ba'athist government collapsed in November 1963 over the question of unification with Syria and the extremist and uncontrollable behavior of al-Sa'di's National Guard. President Arif, with the overwhelming support of the Iraqi military, purged Ba'athists from the government and ordered the National Guard to stand down and disarm. Although al-Bakr had conspired with Arif to remove al-Sa'di, on 5 January 1964, Arif removed al-Bakr from his new position as Vice President for fear of allowing the Ba'ath Party to retain a foothold inside his government.

After the November coup, mounting evidence of Ba'athist atrocities emerged, which Lakeland predicted "will have a more or less permanent effect on the political developments in the country—particularly on the prospects of a Ba'athi revival." Marion Farouk-Sluglett and Peter Sluglett describe the Ba'athists as having cultivated a "profoundly unsavory image" by "acts of wanton brutality" on a scale without prior precedent in Iraq, including "some of the most terrible scenes of violence hitherto experienced in the postwar Middle East." "As almost every family in Baghdad was affected—and both men and women were equally maltreated—the Ba'athists' activities aroused a degree of intense loathing for them that has persisted to this day among many Iraqis of that generation." More broadly, the Slugletts state, "Qasim's failings, serious as they were, can scarcely be discussed in the same terms as the venality, savagery and wanton brutality characteristic of the regimes which followed his own." Batatu recounts: 
In the cellars of al-Nihayyah Palace, which the [National Guard's] Bureau [of Special Investigation] used as its headquarters, were found all sorts of loathsome instruments of torture, including electric wires with pincers, pointed iron stakes on which prisoners were made to sit, and a machine which still bore traces of chopped-off fingers. Small heaps of blooded clothing were scattered about, and there were pools on the floor and stains over the walls.

See also
1959 Mosul uprising
17 July Revolution

Bibliography

Further reading

References

20th-century revolutions
Arab nationalist rebellions
Arab rebellions in Iraq
Rebellions in Iraq
Conflicts in 1963
Military coups in Iraq
1963 in Iraq
Iraq
Ba'athism
History of the Ba'ath Party
Arab nationalism in Iraq
February 1963 events in Asia
Revolutions in Iraq
1960s in Islam
Ramadan